Françoise Wittington (born 7 September 1953) is a French rower. She competed in the women's double sculls event at the 1976 Summer Olympics.

References

1953 births
Living people
French female rowers
Olympic rowers of France
Rowers at the 1976 Summer Olympics
Place of birth missing (living people)